Alliance Truck Parts is an American private brand that provides parts and accessories for heavy-duty trucks. The company was founded in 1998, as Alliance Brand Parts, and is a division of Daimler Truck North America LLC, a wholly owned subsidiary of the Germany's, Daimler Truck AG.

The name change to Alliance Truck Parts occurred in the first quarter of 2011, so that it would more effectively communicate the brand's focus and target market. 

The company mostly offers accessories for all models of American and Canadian heavy duty class 8 diesel trucks, though it offers parts for class 5–7 trucks as well.

Racing Sponsorship

NASCAR Sponsorship with Penske Racing
In the 2010 season of the NASCAR Nationwide Series, Alliance Truck Parts partnered with Penske Racing to sponsor the Alliance Truck Parts Dodge Charger driven by Sam Hornish Jr. in the season's final race at Homestead-Miami Speedway. In the 2011 season, Alliance became the primary sponsor for the Alliance Truck Parts No. 12 Dodge Challenger driven by Hornish for a limited schedule of 8 races. Brad Keselowski will drive an Alliance Truck Parts Ford in the 2014 NASCAR Sprint Cup Series for eight races.

Associates of Alliance Truck Parts include brands such as Detroit Genuine Parts and Thomas Built Buses. In 2016, Keselowski won at Daytona, to record the sponsor's first win in NASCAR. In 2017, the team reduced the number of races from 8 to 6.

Alliance Truck Parts 250

In May 2011, Alliance Truck Parts announced that it had signed a 3-year contract with Michigan International Speedway to acquire the naming rights for the Nationwide Series 250 race held there each June. The first Alliance Truck Parts 250 was held on June 18, 2011.

References

External links 
Official website
 Racing website

Daimler Truck
Trucking industry in the United States
American companies established in 1998